Sir Dingle Mackintosh Foot, QC (24 August 1905 – 18 June 1978) was a British lawyer, Liberal and Labour Member of Parliament, and Solicitor General for England and Wales in the first government of Harold Wilson.

Family and education
Born in Plymouth, Devon, Foot was the eldest son of Isaac Foot, who was a solicitor and founder of the Plymouth law firm, Foot and Bowden. Isaac Foot was an active member of the Liberal Party and was Liberal Member of Parliament for Bodmin in Cornwall between 1922 and 1924 and again from 1929 to 1935, and also a Lord Mayor of Plymouth. 

Dingle Foot was educated at Bembridge School, a boys' independent school on the Isle of Wight, and at Balliol College, Oxford, where he was President of the Oxford Union in 1928. He had four brothers: Michael, a prominent figure in the Labour Party and Leader of the Opposition from 1980 to 1983; John (Lord Foot), a Liberal politician; Hugh (Lord Caradon), Governor of Cyprus and British Ambassador to the United Nations and Christopher, a solicitor who joined the family firm. He also had two sisters. His nephew, Hugh's son, was the campaigning journalist Paul Foot.

He married Dorothy Mary Elliston, who died in 1989. They had no children.

Law career
Foot was admitted to Gray's Inn on 19 November 1925 and called to the bar on 2 July 1930. He became a Master Bencher in 1952 and was appointed Queen's Counsel in 1954 He had been in active practice after having qualified a Barrister of England both in England and in several Commonwealth countries. He was called to the Bar or admitted as a solicitor or practitioner in Ghana (1948), Sri Lanka (1951), Northern Rhodesia (1956), Sierra Leone (1959), Supreme Court of India (as a Senior Advocate) (1960), Bahrain (1962) and Malaysia (1964). He also appeared regularly in the Courts of Kenya, Uganda, Tanganyika, Nyasaland and Pakistan. In addition, he had been regularly engaged in the Judicial Committee of the Privy Council since 1945.

Politics
From 1931 to 1945 Foot was Liberal Member of Parliament (MP) for Dundee. He was Parliamentary Secretary to the Ministry of Economic Warfare in Winston Churchill's wartime coalition, and a member of the British delegation to San Francisco Conference in 1945. He visited Washington in June 1944, and secured an agreement with the US State Department, the new War Refugee Board and the Foreign Economic Administration to supply 550 tons of aid parcels a month over a three-month period to 'unassimilated civilian internees' in war-zones in Europe. At the 1945 election he lost his seat to Labour.

At the 1950 general election Foot defended the formerly Liberal seat of North Cornwall, following the defection of its member Tom Horabin to Labour in 1947, but he again lost, to the Conservative Harold Roper. He stood for the seat in 1951, losing again but by a narrower margin. Foot left the Liberals and joined the Labour Party in 1956. He was Labour MP for Ipswich from a 1957 by-election until 1970. Following his appointment as Solicitor General in the first government of Harold Wilson, he was knighted and made a Privy Counsellor in 1964. He served in this post for almost 3 years, from 18 October 1964 until 24 August 1967, until he was replaced by Arthur Irvine following a major government reshuffle. In 1970 he was again defeated, this time by the Conservative candidate.

Other work
In the late 1940s and early 1950s Foot was often seen on BBC television as the moderator of the current affairs programme In the News.  Often appearing with him were Michael Foot and Sir Bob Boothby.
His publications included Despotism in Disguise (1937) and British Political Crises (1976).

Death
Foot died on 18 June 1978 in a hotel in Hong Kong, after choking on a sandwich.

References

External links 
 
The Papers of Sir Dingle Foot held at Churchill Archives Centre

1905 births
1978 deaths
20th-century British lawyers
Alumni of Balliol College, Oxford
English King's Counsel
Dingle
Knights Bachelor
Labour Party (UK) MPs for English constituencies
Members of Gray's Inn
Members of the Parliament of the United Kingdom for Dundee constituencies
Members of the Parliament of the United Kingdom for Ipswich
Members of the Privy Council of the United Kingdom
Ministers in the Churchill wartime government, 1940–1945
Ministers in the Wilson governments, 1964–1970
People educated at Bembridge School
Politicians from Plymouth, Devon
Presidents of the Oxford Union
20th-century King's Counsel
Scottish Liberal Party MPs
Solicitors General for England and Wales
UK MPs 1931–1935
UK MPs 1935–1945
UK MPs 1955–1959
UK MPs 1959–1964
UK MPs 1964–1966
UK MPs 1966–1970